The Princeton Club of New York was a private club located in Midtown Manhattan, New York City, New York founded in 1866 as the Princeton Alumni Association of New York. It reorganized to its final namesake in 1886. Its membership composed of alumni and faculty of Princeton University, as well as 15 other affiliated schools. In 2021, the club defaulted on its mortgage debt, and its clubhouse is in the process of being sold to the highest bidder.

History
The club was founded as the Princeton Alumni Association of New York in 1866. In 1886, it reorganized as the Princeton Club of New York, incorporating as a club under New York laws on December 12, 1899. Since its incorporation, the club has had four homes, with its current location being at 15 West 43rd Street in Manhattan since February 1963. The clubhouse was established on Clubhouse Row, where many of New York City's other clubs are located.

The club suffered during the COVID pandemic and shut down for 15 months and lost about one-third of its fees-paying members. In October 2021, the club defaulted on $39.3 million in mortgage debt from lender Sterling National Bank, and as a result, the building is in the process of being sold to the highest bidder. In December 2021, 15 West 43rd Street LLC purchased the defaulted loan from Sterling National Bank and in June 2022 the LLC sued to foreclose on the property. Unlike other alumni clubs on Clubhouse Row, the organization has no financial relation to Princeton University.

Amenities
The ten-story club featured a variety of amenities for its members, including two restaurants, banquet space, a fitness center, squash courts, and 58 guest rooms. The club featured , where it hosts events throughout the year for its members.

Membership
Membership in the Princeton Club was restricted to alumni, faculty, and students of Princeton University, as well as 15 other affiliated schools. Per the club's official website, which is now shuttered, it served over 6,000 alumni.

Since its creation, other schools' clubs had moved in-residence, such as Columbia University in 1998 and Williams College in 2010. The Columbia University Club of New York later moved out in 2017 because of issues with the residence agreement and is now in residence at the nearby 30 West 44th Street home of the Penn Club.

See also
List of American gentlemen's clubs

References

1899 establishments in New York City
Princeton University
Midtown Manhattan
Gentlemen's clubs in New York City
Organizations established in 1899